Soundies are three-minute American musical films, each displaying a performance. The shorts were produced between 1940 and 1946 and have been referred to as "precursors to music videos" by UCLA. Soundies exhibited a variety of musical genres in an effort to draw a broad audience. The shorts were originally viewed in public places on "Panorams": coin-operated, 16mm rear projection machines. Panorams were typically located in businesses like nightclubs, bars, and restaurants. Due to World War II, Soundies also featured patriotic messages and advertisements for war bonds. More adult shorts, such as burlesque and stripteases, were produced to appeal to soldiers on leave.

Technology 
Produced professionally on 35 mm black-and-white film, like theatrical motion pictures, they were printed on the more portable and economical 16 mm film.

The Panoram "movie jukebox" was manufactured by the Mills Novelty Company of Chicago. Each Panoram housed a 16 mm RCA film projector, with eight Soundies films threaded in an endless-loop arrangement. A system of mirrors flashed the image from the lower half of the cabinet onto a front-facing screen in the top half. Each film cost 10 cents to play, with no choice of song; the patron saw whatever film was next in the queue. Panorams could be found in public amusement centers, nightclubs, taverns, restaurants, and factory lounges, and the films were changed weekly. The completed Soundies were generally made available within a few weeks of their filming, by the Soundies Distributing Corporation of America.

Several production companies filmed the Soundies shorts in New York City, Hollywood, and Chicago: James Roosevelt's Globe Productions (1940–41), Cinemasters (1940–41), Minoco Productions (owned by Mills Novelty, 1941–43),<ref>{{IMDb title|0814137|Ain't Misbehavin' (soundie with Fats Waller)}}</ref> RCM Productions (1941–46), LOL Productions (1943), Glamourettes (1943), Filmcraft Productions (1943–46), and Alexander Productions (1946) led by William D. Alexander). The performers recorded the music in advance, and mimed to the soundtrack during filming.

The movie-jukebox idea developed several imitations and variations of the technical design; the most successful of these imitators were the Techniprocess company (managed by Rudy Vallee) and the Featurettes company, which used original novelty songs and usually unknown talent (17-year-old Gwen Verdon appears in a couple of the Featurettes as "Gwen Verdun"). As Soundies quickly gained most of the market for jukebox films, the other companies disbanded, and some sold their films to the Soundies concern.

Musical genres
Soundies emphasized variety from their beginning; the first three bandleaders who contracted for Soundies were boogie-woogie specialist Will Bradley,  established popular music maestro Vincent Lopez, and Hawaiian singer-leader Ray Kinney. Soundies displayed all genres of music, from classical to big-band swing, and from hillbilly novelties to patriotic songs. Harry McClintock, Jimmy Dorsey, Louis Jordan, Spike Jones, Stan Kenton, Kay Starr, Johnnie Johnston, Les Brown, The Hoosier Hot Shots, Charlie Spivak, Martha Tilton, Sally Rand, Nick Lucas, Gene Krupa, Anita O'Day, Jimmie Dodd, Merle Travis, and Lawrence Welk were some of the leading Soundies performers. Many stars of the future made appearances in Soundies at the beginning of their careers, including Gale Storm, Dorothy Dandridge, Ricardo Montalbán, Liberace, Doris Day, Gloria Grahame, Cyd Charisse, Alan Ladd, Marilyn Maxwell, and Yvonne DeCarlo.

Many nightclub and recording artists also made Soundies, including Harry "The Hipster" Gibson, Benny Fields, Frances Faye, Gloria Parker, Charles Magnante, Milton DeLugg, and Gus Van. In the mid-1940s, during a moratorium imposed by James Petrillo of the musicians' union, Soundies resorted to filming nonmusical vaudeville acts, featuring exotic dancers Sally Rand and Faith Bacon, animal acts, acrobats, impressionists, and jugglers.

Beginning in 1941, Soundies experimented with expanding its format, and filmed comedy Soundies with Our Gang actor Carl "Alfalfa" Switzer, Broadway comic Willie Howard, dialect comedians Smith and Dale, Harry Langdon, Snub Pollard, and The Keystone Kops. Most of these films were nonmusical, and were not as well received as the musical Soundies. Soundies abandoned the comedy-sketch idea, but continued to produce filmed versions of comic novelty songs.

By the time Louis Jordan moved from swing music to jump blues with his new band Tympany Five in the late 1940s, he was often using Soundies as promotional material.Louis Jordan and his Tympany Band: Films and Soundies

More than 1,800 Soundies minimusicals were made, many of which have been released on home video. The Soundies films were regularly described and reviewed in the entertainment and music trade publications, such as Billboard.

Success, then readjustment
During their first year, the Soundies made millions of dollars (in dimes). However, in late 1941, the federal government restricted the use of rubber and precious metals, prioritizing these resources for military use during wartime. This meant that Mills Novelty could no longer build and sell Panoram machines, and had to confine its activities to keeping the existing projectors supplied with films. Soundies became strictly a production company, dedicated to making its own musical shorts.

Legacy
For today's filmmakers and archivists, Soundies are known for preserving rare performances of African-American artists who had fewer opportunities to perform in mainstream films. Artists such as The Ink Spots, Fats Waller, Duke Ellington, Louis Jordan, Sister Rosetta Tharpe, Dorothy Dandridge, Big Joe Turner, Bob Howard, Billy Eckstine, Count Basie, The Mills Brothers, Herb Jeffries, Cab Calloway, Meade Lux Lewis, Lena Horne, Louis Armstrong, Nat King Cole, and Stepin Fetchit all made Soundies (a handful of whom were excerpted from longer theatrical films).

Eclipse
The Soundies Distributing Corporation of America remained active until 1947. With commercial television developing rapidly, the Soundies machines and films became obsolete. Almost all of the Panoram jukeboxes were either junked or modified into self-service "peepshow" machines, although the remaining Panorams are in the hands of collectors and are occasionally offered for sale. The library of 1,800 Soundies films was sold to home-movie companies Castle Films and Official Films, then to syndicated television, and ultimately to home video (via England's Charly Records).

Telescriptions and Scopitones

The Soundies concept was revived in 1951 by producer Louis D. Snader. Radio stations relied on transcriptions—recorded musical performances. Snader brought the idea to television with films, which he called "Snader Telescriptions." Snader hired dozens of pop-music acts and vaudeville performers, many of whom had already appeared in Soundies, to star in his new films. Snader Telescriptions are often confused with Soundies because of their similarity in length and personnel.

In 1958, the original Soundies "jukebox" concept was revived by French company Cameca as Scopitone. Similar to Soundies, Scopitones are short musical films designed to be played on a specially designed coin-operated jukebox, but with new technical improvements - color and high-fidelity sound. Scopitones were printed on color 16 mm film with magnetic sound instead of Soundies' optical sound. By the mid-1960s, Scopitone jukeboxes had spread across England and the United States.

Documentaries
Three documentaries have been produced about Soundies. Don McGlynn produced and edited The Soundies in 1986, hosted by Cab Calloway; the film was broadcast nationally on PBS. Dewey Russell compiled an hourlong, direct-to-video history, "Soundies: Music Video from the '40s" in 1987, narrated by Michael Sollazzo. Chris Lamson produced "Soundies: A Musical History," hosted by Michael Feinstein, in 2007 for PBS.

References

 Further reading 

 Susan Delson: Soundies and the Changing Image of Black Americans on Screen: One Dime at a Time.'' Indiana University Press, 2021, ISBN 9780253058546

External links
 

Short film series